Albany Law School is a private law school in Albany, New York. It was founded in 1851 and is the oldest independent law school in the nation. It is accredited by the American Bar Association and has an affiliation agreement with University at Albany that includes shared programs. The school is located near New York's highest court, federal courts, the executive branch, and the state legislature.

History

Albany Law School is the oldest independent law school in the United States.  It was founded in 1851 by Amos Dean (its dean until 1868), Amasa J. Parker, Ira Harris, and others.

Beginning in 1878, the Albany College of Pharmacy, Albany Law School, Albany Medical College, Dudley Observatory, Graduate College of Union University, and Union College created the loose association today known as Union University. Each member institution has its own governing board, is fiscally independent, and is responsible for its own programs.

Albany Law School has a historically close relationship with the New York Court of Appeals.  One of the original members of the court, Greene C. Bronson, helped to found the law school.   Since that time, Albany Law School alumni have been members of the court nine times with two serving as Chief Judge of the New York Court of Appeals. In addition, the school hosts the Fund for Modern Courts' Hugh R. Jones Memorial Lecture, which is typically given by a current or former member of the court.

The law school inducted its first permanent female President & Dean, Penelope Andrews, on July 1, 2012. On July 1, 2015, Alicia Ouellette became President & Dean.

Location
Albany Law is the only law school located within 90 miles of New York's Capital District.  It is within two miles of the New York State Legislature, New York Court of Appeals, the Appellate Division 3rd Department, the Federal District Court for the Northern District of New York, the New York State Bar Association, several state agencies, and a number of private law firms.

Entrance statistics
For the 2019 class, 52.53% of applicants were accepted with 27.65% of those accepted enrolling, the 
50th Percentile LSAT score of enrollees being 153 and the 50th Percentile GPA being 3.37.

Programs and centers
Albany Law School offers 14 concentrations for J.D. candidates,  as well as an L.L.M program,  and joint J.D./M.B.A, J.D./M.P.A., J.D./M.R.P., J.D./M.S., and J.D./M.S.W. programs.

Albany Law School is home to several centers of legal study: The Government Law Center, The Center for Excellence in Law Teaching, The Institute of Legal Studies, The Institute for Financial Market Regulation, and The Center for Judicial Process.

In addition, under the auspices of its Law Clinic and Justice Center, Albany Law School operates several public interest clinics.  Some of the clinics available include the Health Law Clinic, Community Development Clinic, Domestic Violence Prosecution, and Family Violence Litigation.

Albany Law School's Schaffer Law Library holds a collection of more than 730,000 volumes and equivalents,  including videotapes of oral arguments before the New York State Court of Appeals dating back to 1989.

Academics
Albany Law School offers courses and concentrations for the following degree programs: J.D., LL.M., and M.S. It offers joint degrees with the College of Saint Rose, Union Graduate College, The Sage Colleges, University at Albany, Rensselaer Polytechnic Institute, Alden March Bioethics Institute at Albany Medical College, and Mount Sinai School of Medicine. Albany Law School also has an affiliation agreement with University at Albany that includes shared programs and access for students and faculty to learn from one another.

Law journals

In 1875, Albany Law published the nation's first student-edited legal periodical, the Albany Law School Journal, which existed for only one academic year before being discontinued.  Currently, the school publishes three journals, which are listed in order of their founding:

 Albany Law Review
 Albany Law Journal of Science and Technology
 Albany Government Law Review

Notable faculty

Full Time faculty:
 Alicia Ouellette, President and Dean 
 Ira Mark Bloom, Trusts, Estates, and Property lawyer
 Vincent M. Bonventre, Judicial and Constitutional Law lawyer and commentator
 Raymond H. Brescia, Public Interest Law lawyer and commentator
 Patrick M. Connors, New York Civil Practice and Legal Ethics lawyer

Adjunct faculty:
 Mae D'Agostino, United States District Judge for the Northern District of New York
 Lawrence E. Kahn, Senior United States District Judge for the Northern District of New York
 Eleanor Stein,  Administrative Law Judge, former member of Weather Underground and Students for a Democratic Society

Former faculty:
 Penelope Andrews, Dean of the faculty of law at the University of Cape Town
 Learned Hand, United States Judge and legal philosopher
 Patricia Salkin, Dean of Touro Law Center
 David D. Siegel, commentator on New York Civil Practice

Notable alumni

Albany Law School has numerous notable alumni.  It is one of only twelve law schools in the United States to have graduated two or more justices of the United States Supreme Court: Robert H. Jackson and David Josiah Brewer. Nine judges of the New York State Court of Appeals, United States President William McKinley, former New York Governor Andrew Cuomo, former Fox News anchor Megyn Kelly, and over a dozen members of the United States Congress also attended Albany Law School.  The first woman admitted to the New York State Bar, Kate Stoneman, and the first African American man to graduate from law school in New York State, James Campbell Matthews, also both attended Albany Law School.

Other notable alumni include: Richard D. Parsons '71, Former Chairman, Citigroup, Lawrence H. Cooke '39, Former Chief Judge of New York State, Victoria A. Graffeo '77, Former Associate Judge, New York State Court of Appeals, Leslie Stein '81, Associate Judge, New York State Court of Appeals, and Thomas J. Vilsack '75, U.S. Secretary of Agriculture and Governor of Iowa.

Employment and rankings 
Albany Law School was ranked 106th in U.S. News & World Reports 2018 ranking of law schools. The winter 2016 issue of preLaw magazine ranked Albany Law number 1 for government careers, citing its "A" grades in curriculum and employment, and number 6 for public defender and prosecutor jobs.

According to Albany Law School's 2016 ABA-required disclosures, 81% of the class of 2016  obtained full-time, long-term, JD-required employment ten months after graduation. 126 of 151 graduates obtained full-time, long-term work and 4 graduates obtained either part-time short-term, part-time long-term or full-time short-term positions.
Albany Law School's 2016 Law School Transparency under-employment score is 18%, indicating the percentage of the Class of 2015 unemployed, pursuing an additional degree, or working in a non-professional, short-term, or part-time job nine months after graduation.

Employment Summary for 2016 Graduates

Costs
The total cost of attendance (indicating the cost of tuition, fees, and living expenses) at Albany Law School for the 2014–2015 academic year is $59,728. The Law School Transparency estimated debt-financed cost of attendance for three years is $234,466. Tuition is  $43,248.  In 2015, the school awarded $7 million in financial aid, and over 60% of first-year students received merit scholarships.

See also
 Law of New York

References

External links
 

 
Law schools in New York (state)
1851 establishments in New York (state)